The  is the central bank of Japan. The bank is often called  for short. It has its headquarters in Chūō, Tokyo.

History
Like most modern Japanese institutions, the Bank of Japan was founded after the Meiji Restoration. Prior to the Restoration, Japan's feudal fiefs all issued their own money, hansatsu, in an array of incompatible denominations, but the New Currency Act of Meiji 4 (1871) did away with these and established the yen as the new decimal currency, which had parity with the Mexican silver dollar. The former han (fiefs) became prefectures and their mints became private chartered banks which, however, initially retained the right to print money. For a time both the central government and these so-called "national" banks issued money. A period of unanticipated consequences was ended when the Bank of Japan was founded in Meiji 15 (10 October 1882), under the Bank of Japan Act 1882 (27 June 1882), after a Belgian model. It has since been partly privately owned (its stock is traded over the counter, hence the stock number). A number of modifications based on other national banks were encompassed within the regulations under which the bank was founded.  The institution was given a monopoly on controlling the money supply in 1884, but it would be another 20 years before the previously issued notes were retired.

Following the passage of the Convertible Bank Note Regulations (May 1884), the Bank of Japan issued its first banknotes in 1885  (Meiji 18). Despite some small glitches—for example, it turned out that the konjac powder mixed in the paper to prevent counterfeiting made the bills a delicacy for rats—the run was largely successful. In 1897, Japan joined the gold standard, and in 1899 the former "national" banknotes were formally phased out.

Since its Meiji era beginnings, the Bank of Japan has operated continuously from main offices in Tokyo and Osaka.

Reorganization
There was a brief post-war period during the Occupation of Japan when the bank's functions were suspended, and military currency was issued. In 1949, the bank was again restructured.

In the 1970s, the bank's operating environment evolved along with the transition from a fixed foreign currency exchange rate and a rather closed economy to a large open economy with a variable exchange rate.

During the entire post-war era, until at least 1991, the Bank of Japan's monetary policy has primarily been conducted via its 'window guidance' (窓口指導) credit controls (which are the model for the Chinese central bank's primary tool of monetary policy implementation), whereby the central bank would impose bank credit growth quotas on the commercial banks. The tool was instrumental in the creation of the 'bubble economy' of the 1980s. It was implemented by the Bank of Japan's then "Business Department" (営業局), which was headed during the "bubble years" from 1986 to 1989 by Toshihiko Fukui (who became deputy governor in the 1990s and governor in 2003).

A certain degree of dependence might be said to be enshrined in the new Law, article 4 of which states:
 In recognition of the fact that currency and monetary control is a component of overall economic policy, the Bank of Japan shall always maintain close contact with the government and exchange views sufficiently, so that its currency and monetary control and the basic stance of the government's economic policy shall be mutually harmonious.

However, since the introduction of the new law, the Bank of Japan has rebuffed government requests to stimulate the economy.

The trail of policies

When the Nixon shock happened in August 1971, the Bank of Japan (BOJ) could have appreciated the currency in order to avoid inflation. However, they still kept the fixed exchange rate as 360Yen/$ for two weeks, so it caused excess liquidity. In addition, they persisted with the Smithsonian rate (308Yen/$), and continued monetary easing until 1973. This created a greater-than-10% inflation rate at that time. In order to control stagflation, they raised the official bank rate from 7% to 9% and skyrocketing prices gradually ended in 1978.

In 1979, when the energy crisis happened, the BOJ raised the official bank rate rapidly. The BOJ succeeded in a quick economic recovery. After overcoming the crisis, they reduced the official bank rate. In 1980, the BOJ reduced the official bank rate from 9.0% to 8.25% in August, to 7.25% in November, and to 5.5% in December in 1981. "Reaganomics" was in vogue in America and USD became strong. However, Japan tried to implement fiscal reconstruction at that time, so they did not stop their financial regulation.

In 1985, the agreement of G5 nations, known as the Plaza Accord, USD slipped down and Yen/USD changed from 240yen/$ to 200yen/$ at the end of 1985. Even in 1986, USD continued to fall and reached 160yen/$. In order to escape deflation, the BOJ cut the official bank rate from 5% to 4.5% in January, to 4.0% in March, to 3.5% in April, 3.0% in November. At the same time, the government tried to raise demand in Japan in 1985, and did economy policy in 1986. However, the market was confused about the rapid fall of USD. After the Louvre Accord in February 1987, the BOJ decreased the official bank rate from 3% to 2.5%, but JPY/USD was 140yen/$ at that time and reached 125yen/$ in the end of 1987. The BOJ kept the official bank rate at 2.5% until May in 1989. Financial and fiscal regulation led to a widespread over-valuing of real estate and investments and Japan faced a bubble at that time.

After 1990, the stock market and real asset market fell. At that time BOJ regulated markets until 1991 in order to end the bubble.

In January 1995, a terrible earthquake happened and Japanese yen became stronger and stronger. JPY/USD reached 80yen/$, so the BOJ reduced the office bank rate to 0.5% and the yen recovered. The period of deflation started at that time.

In 1999, the BOJ started zero-interest-rate policy (ZIRP), but they ended it despite government opposition when the IT bubble happened in 2000. However, Japan's economic bubble burst in 2001 and the BOJ adopted the balance of current account as the main operating target for the adjustment of the financial market in March 2001 (quantitative relaxation policy), shifting from the zero-interest-rate policy. From 2003 to 2004, Japanese government did exchange intervention operation in huge amount, and the economy recovered a lot. In March 2006, BOJ finished quantitative easing, and finished the zero-interest-rate policy in June and raised to 0.25%.

In 2008, the financial crisis happened, and Japanese economy turned bad again. BOJ reduced the uncollateralized call rate to 0.3% and adopted the supplemental balance of current account policy. In December 2008, BOJ reduced uncollateralized call rate again to 0.1% and they started to buy Japanese Government Bond (JGB) along with commercial paper (CP) and corporate bonds.

In 2013, the head of the BOJ (Kuroda) announced a new quantitative easing program (QE). This program would be very large in terms of quantity, but it would also be different in terms of quality—qualitative easing (QQE). In other words, the BOJ would (and did) also purchase riskier assets like stocks and REITs.

In 2016, the BOJ initiated yield curve control (YCC).

In 2016, the BOJ started its negative interest rates policy (NIRP).

They are the largest owner of Japanese stocks.

Curbing deflation
Following the election of Prime Minister Shinzō Abe in December 2012, the Bank of Japan, with Abe's urging, took proactive steps to curb deflation in Japan. On 30 October 2012, The Bank of Japan announced that it would undertake further monetary-easing action for the second time in a month.  Under the leadership of new Governor Haruhiko Kuroda, the Bank of Japan released a statement on 5 April 2013 announcing that it would be purchasing securities and bonds at a rate of 60-70 trillion yen a year in an attempt to double Japan's money base in two years.
But by 2016, it was apparent that three years of monetary easing had had little effect on deflation so the Bank of Japan instigated a review of its monetary stimulus program.

Mission

According to its charter, the missions of the Bank of Japan are

 Issuance and management of banknotes
 Implementation of monetary policy
 Providing settlement services and ensuring the stability of the financial system
 Treasury and government securities-related operations
 International activities
 Compilation of data, economic analyses and research activities

Location
The Bank of Japan is headquartered in Nihonbashi, Chūō, Tokyo, on the site of a former gold mint (the Kinza) and, not coincidentally, near the famous Ginza district, whose name means "silver mint".  The Neo-baroque Bank of Japan building in Tokyo was designed by Tatsuno Kingo in 1896.

The Osaka branch in Nakanoshima is sometimes considered as the structure which effectively symbolizes the bank as an institution.

Governor

The  has considerable influence on the economic policy of the Japanese government. Japanese lawmakers endorse the Bank of Japan Governor Haruhiko Kuroda. He is seen to adopt the Reflation policy as part of Abenomics.

List of governors

Monetary Policy Board
As of 9 April 2018, the board responsible for setting monetary policy consisted of the following 9 members:
Haruhiko Kuroda, Governor of the BOJ
Masayoshi Amamiya, Deputy Governor of the BOJ
Masazumi Wakatabe, Deputy Governor of the BOJ
Yutaka Harada
Yukitoshi Funo
Makoto Sakurai
Takako Masai
Hitoshi Suzuki
Goushi Kataoka

Subsidiaries and properties 
Bank of Japan owns 4.7% of the Tokyo Stock Exchange. Since 2020 it has owned more of the market than any other body.

See also

Japanese yen
Economy of Japan
Japan Mint
Bank of England
European Central Bank
Federal Reserve
Reserve Bank of India

Notes

References and further reading

 Bank of Japan. Functions and operations of the Bank of Japan (Institute for Monetary and Economic Studies, 2nd ed. 2012),  online 
 Cargill, Thomas F., Michael M. Hutchison and Takatoshi Itō. (1997). The political economy of Japanese monetary policy. Cambridge: MIT Press. ;  OCLC 502984085 
 Hamaoka, Itsuo. A study on the Central Bank of Japan (1902) online
 Longford, Joseph Henry. (1912).  Japan of the Japanese.   New York: C. Scribner's sons. 
 Masaoka, Naoichi.  (1914).  Japan to America: A Symposium of Papers by Political Leaders and Representative Citizens of Japan on Conditions in Japan and on the Relations Between Japan and the United States.   New York: G.P. Putnam's Sons (Japan Society). 
 Nussbaum, Louis Frédéric and Käthe Roth. (2005). Japan Encyclopedia. Cambridge: Harvard University Press. ; OCLC 48943301 
 Ohnuki, Mari, Daisuke Murakami, and Masanori Takashima. "Research on financial and monetary history based on the records of the Bank of Japan Archives: a note." Financial History Review 17.2 (2010):273-280. DOI:10.1017/S096856501000020X
 Sarasas Phra. Money and Banking in Japan (1940) online
 Shizume, Masato. "A History of the Bank of Japan, 1882–2016." (Waseda University, 2016) online 
 Vande Walle, Willy et al.  "Institutions and ideologies: the modernization of monetary, legal and law enforcement 'regimes' in Japan in the early Meiji-period (1868-1889)"  (abstract). FRIS/Katholieke Universiteit Leuven, 2007.
 Werner, Richard A. (2005). New Paradigm in Macroeconomics: Solving the Riddle of Japanese Macroeconomic Performance. New York: Palgrave Macmillan. ; ;  OCLC 56413058 
 _. (2003). Princes of the Yen: Japan's Central Bankers and the Transformation of the Economy. Armonk, New York: M.E. Sharpe. ;  OCLC 471605161

External links

  
 Building a national currency (1868-99)
 Japan and World Interest Rates, Interest Rates data and chart daily updated by ForexMotion

 
Chūō, Tokyo
Japan
Banks of Japan
Economy of Japan
Banks established in 1882
Japanese companies established in 1882
Buildings of the Meiji period
Nihonbashi, Tokyo